Feyzabad (also Romanized as Feyẕābād, Faizābād, and Feiz Abad) is a village in Nasrovan Rural District, in the Central District of Darab County, Fars Province, Iran. At the 2006 census, its population was 277, in 58 families.

References 

Populated places in Darab County